Popcorn effect may refer to:

 The tendency of larger particles to bounce higher than smaller ones on high-frequency vibrating screens
 The possibility of moisture causing defects in electronics; see:
 Moisture sensitivity level
 Mobile device forensics

See also
 Cheerios effect
 Brazil nut effect